Jerome Kretchmer (born September 15, 1934) is an American politician who served in the New York State Assembly from 1963 to 1970.

References

1934 births
Living people
Democratic Party members of the New York State Assembly